Trava zelena is the fourth album by Croatian singer Severina. It was released in 1995 by Croatia Records. The producers of the album are Zrinko Tutić, Nikša Bratoš, Miro Buljan and Vedran Ostojić. Other collaborators are Faruk Buljubasic, Nenad Ninčević, Rajko Dujmić, and for the first time Severina herself is signed as the author of three texts on the album.

Track listing
"Trava zelena" (Green Grass)
"Vatra i led" (Fire and Ice)
"Ti si srce moje" (You Are My Heart)
"Mr. Taliman" (Mr. Tally Man)
"Bože moj" (My God)
"Bambola" (Doll)
"Lude godine" (Crazy Years)
"Poželi me" (Want Me)
"Pruži mi ruke" (Give Me Your Hands)
"Ludo moja" (My Fool)

References

External links

1995 albums
Severina (singer) albums